Arthrocereus melanurus is a species of plant in the family Cactaceae. It is endemic to Brazil.  Its natural habitats are dry savanna and rocky areas. It is threatened largely by habitat loss.

References

Endemic flora of Brazil
Vulnerable plants
melanurus
Taxonomy articles created by Polbot